Holmeson is an unincorporated community located within Millstone Township in Monmouth County, New Jersey, United States. As it is located along County Route 537 through which the Monmouth–Ocean county line runs down the center, portions of the community are also located in Jackson Township. Owing to its location near Interstate 195 and Six Flags Great Adventure, the community is mostly made up of gas stations, restaurants, and small businesses though the Jackson Premium Outlets occupies land just south of the community.

The area is served as United States Postal Service ZIP code 08510. As of the 2010 United States Census, the population for ZIP Code Tabulation Area 08510 was 5,231.

References

Millstone Township, New Jersey
Jackson Township, New Jersey
Unincorporated communities in Monmouth County, New Jersey
Unincorporated communities in Ocean County, New Jersey
Unincorporated communities in New Jersey